The Chennai International Film Festival (CIFF) is a festival organised in the city of Chennai, India, by a film society, the Indo Cine Appreciation Foundation (ICAF), with the support of   The Government of Tamil Nadu, the South Indian Film Chamber of Commerce and the Film Federation of India.

From the official website, the festival aims at:

providing a common platform for the film fraternity to show its expression through films; understanding other cultures and project the excellence of this art form; contribute to the understanding and appreciation of film cultures of the different nations in the context of the social and cultural ethos; and promote friendship and co-operation among peoples of the world.

The festival has been organised since 2002. It showcases international as well as Indian feature films. The Indian language films are divided into the Tamil (12 films) and the Indian panorama featured films (around 12 films). The festival screens more than 100 international feature films.

The CIFF provide awards in the following categories:
  The Best film in Tamil.
  The Second Best film.
  Special Jury Award for individual excellence
  Online Film buff Award
  Amitabh Bachchan Youth Icon Award, from 2013

Winners

13th CIFF (2015)

8th CIFF (2010)

References

External links

Film festivals established in 2002
Film festivals in India
Culture of Chennai
2002 establishments in Tamil Nadu
Tamil film awards
Events in Chennai